Soundtrack to a Revolution is the fifth full-length album by the Christian ska band The Insyderz. Released on November 11, 2003, the album was produced and recorded by Royce Nunley at Ringside Recording Studios.

Track listing
 "Soundtrack To A Revolution"
 "Call To Arms"
 "Testimony"
 "God Almighty"
 "Shoot Out"
 "Seeing Voices"
 "Chosen Few"
 "Another Sleepless Night"
 "Better Half"
 "Shame On Me"

Personnel

Joe- vocals
Nate- drums
Alan- cornet
Beau- bass
Sang- trombone
Michael- guitar
Bram- trumpet

The Insyderz albums
2003 albums